Boyle is a barony in County Roscommon, Republic of Ireland.

Etymology
Boyle barony is named after Boyle town, itself named after Boyle Abbey, which is named after the Boyle River.

Geography
Boyle barony is located in the far north of County Roscommon, separated from County Sligo by Lough Gara, the Curlew Mountains and Lough Arrow, and separated from County Leitrim by Lough Allen and the River Shannon. It contains Lough Key.

History

Boyle barony loosely corresponds to the ancient Gaelic kingdom of Magh Luirg an Dagda (Moylurg), the "plain of the tracks of Dagda."

In the 1585 Composition of Connacht, Boyle barony was confirmed as the possession of the Mac Diarmada, except for those parts which belonged to the Queen (then Elizabeth I) or the Church of Ireland.

List of settlements

Below is a list of settlements in Boyle barony:
Arigna
Ballyfarnon
Boyle
Cortober
Cootehall
Croghan
Keadue
Knockvicar

References

Baronies of County Roscommon